Baron Lang may refer to:

 Cosmo Gordon Lang (1864-1945), 1st Baron Lang of Lambeth, Archbishop of Canterbury
 Ian Lang (born 1940), Baron Lang of Monkton, British politician